Chã Grande is a city located in the state of Pernambuco, Brazil. It is 80 km away from Recife, the capital of the state of Pernambuco. It has an estimated (IBGE 2020) population of 21,815 inhabitants.

Geography
 State - Pernambuco
 Region - Zona da Mata Pernambucana
 Boundaries - Gravatá (N and W); Amaraji and Primavera (S); Pombos  (E)
 Area - 70.19 km2
 Elevation - 470 m
 Hydrography - Capibaribe and Ipojuca rivers
 Vegetation - Caatinga Hipoxerófila and Caducifólia forest
 Climate - Hot tropical and humid
 Annual average temperature - 22.6 c
 Distance to Recife - 80 km

Economy
The main economic activities in Chã Grande are based in agribusiness, especially sugarcane, bananas; and livestock such as cattle, sheep, goats and poultry.

Economic indicators

Economy by Sector
2006

Health indicators

References

Municipalities in Pernambuco